The 1981 National Camogie League is a competition in the women's team field sport of camogie was won by Dublin, who defeated Cork in the final, played at Russell Park.

Arrangements
Counties played each other twice for the first time in the history of the Camogie League. Cork beat Kilkenny and Wexford at home and away while Dublin defeated Antrim and Down and got a walkover from Derry who found it difficult to travel for their fixture. Limerick won their group from Clare, Galway and Tipperary and were beaten in the semi-final by Dublin.

Final
Marian Conroy’s accuracy from frees secured the title for Dublin. The first goal of the game came in the 37th minute from a fine movement involving Joan Gormley, Marian Conroy and Orla Ní Ríain who sent the ball to the net. Cork replied in the 45th minute with a goal by Pat Moloney, leaving three points between the sides but despite a concerted effort by the Cork forwards during the last quarter their scoring efforts were repulsed by Yvonne Redmond in the Dublin goal. Cork were without their star forward Mary O'Leary.

Agnes Hourigan wrote in the Irish Press: It was Dublin’s ability to pick off points that ensured victory. Strength at midfield and consistency in defence were the features of the Dublin team.

Division 2
The Junior National League, known since 2006 as Division Two, was won by Cavan who defeated Louth by four points to two in the lowest scoring final in the history of the division, In the replay on July 5 at Castlebellingham, Eileen Clarke saved the day for Cavan when she pointed from play to force a 2–4 to 1–7 draw at Cootheill on May 30. Cavan had led 2–2 to 0–3 at half time thanks to goals from Bernie O'Callaghan and Ann O'Sullivan. Noeleen Brady scored all of Louth’s total of 1–7. Cavan led 0-4 to nil at half-time in the replay. Bernie O'Callaghan scored all of Cavan’s points, while Noeleen Brady scored two Louth points in reply in the second half. Vivienne Kelly in the Louth goal was player of the match for both draw and replay. Louth were reigning Leinster junior champions and had beaten Kildare in the Division 2 semi-final. Kildare were 1980 Division 2 finalists and were to become 1981 Leinster junior champions.

Final stages

 
|}

References

External links
 Camogie Association

National Camogie League
1981